Bernard Chrzanowski (27 July 1861, Wojnowice - 12 December 1944, Konstancin-Jeziorna) was a Polish social and political activist, president of the Union of the Greater Poland Falcons (Związek Sokołów Wielkopolskich) "Sokół".

References
 Witold Jakóbczyk, Przetrwać na Wartą 1815-1914, Dzieje narodu i państwa polskiego, vol. III-55, Krajowa Agencja Wydawnicza, Warszawa 1989

1861 births
1944 deaths
People from Nowy Tomyśl County
People from the Province of Posen
Polish Party politicians
National-Democratic Party (Poland) politicians
Members of the 10th Reichstag of the German Empire
Members of the 11th Reichstag of the German Empire
Members of the 12th Reichstag of the German Empire
Senators of the Second Polish Republic (1935–1938)
Recipients of the Order of Polonia Restituta
Polish deputies to the Reichstag in Berlin
Member of the Tomasz Zan Society 
Members of the Polish Gymnastic Society "Sokół"